The Hahn–Banach theorem is a central tool in functional analysis. 
It allows the extension of bounded linear functionals defined on a subspace of some vector space to the whole space, and it also shows that there are "enough" continuous linear functionals defined on every normed vector space to make the study of the dual space "interesting". Another version of the Hahn–Banach theorem is known as the Hahn–Banach separation theorem or the hyperplane separation theorem, and has numerous uses in convex geometry.

History

The theorem is named for the mathematicians Hans Hahn and Stefan Banach, who proved it independently in the late 1920s. 
The special case of the theorem for the space  of continuous functions on an interval was proved earlier (in 1912) by Eduard Helly, and a more general extension theorem, the M. Riesz extension theorem, from which the Hahn–Banach theorem can be derived, was proved in 1923 by Marcel Riesz.

The first Hahn–Banach theorem was proved by Eduard Helly in 1921 who showed that certain linear functionals defined on a subspace of a certain type of normed space had an extension of the same norm. Helly did this through the technique of first proving that a one-dimensional extension exists (where the linear functional has its domain extended by one dimension) and then using induction.  In 1927, Hahn defined general Banach spaces and used Helly's technique to prove a norm-preserving version of Hahn–Banach theorem for Banach spaces (where a bounded linear functional on a subspace has a bounded linear extension of the same norm to the whole space).  In 1929, Banach, who was unaware of Hahn's result, generalized it by replacing the norm-preserving version with the dominated extension version that uses sublinear functions.  Whereas Helly's proof used mathematical induction, Hahn and Banach both used transfinite induction.

The Hahn–Banach theorem arose from attempts to solve infinite systems of linear equations. This is needed to solve problems such as the moment problem, whereby given all the potential moments of a function one must determine if a function having these moments exists, and, if so, find it in terms of those moments. Another such problem is the Fourier cosine series problem, whereby given all the potential Fourier cosine coefficients one must determine if a function having those coefficients exists, and, again, find it if so.

In effect, they needed to solve the following problem: 

() Given a collection  of bounded linear functionals on a normed space  and a collection of scalars  determine if there is an  such that  for all 

If  happens to be a reflexive space then to solve the vector problem, it suffices to solve the following dual problem:

(The functional problem) Given a collection  of vectors in a normed space  and a collection of scalars  determine if there is a bounded linear functional  on  such that  for all 

Riesz went on to define  space in 1910 and the  spaces in 1913.  While investigating these spaces he proved a special case of the Hahn–Banach theorem.  Helly also proved a special case of the Hahn–Banach theorem in 1912.  In 1910, Riesz solved the functional problem for some specific spaces and in 1912, Helly solved it for a more general class of spaces. It wasn't until 1932 that Banach, in one of the first important applications of the Hahn–Banach theorem, solved the general functional problem.  The following theorem states the general functional problem and characterizes its solution.

The Hahn–Banach theorem can be deduced from the above theorem. If  is reflexive then this theorem solves the vector problem.

Hahn–Banach theorem

Hence the reason why the following version of the Hahn-Banach theorem is called . 

 
 
A function  is convex and satisfies  if and only if  for all vectors  and all non-negative real  such that  Every sublinear function is a convex function. 

If  is linear then  if and only if  
which is the (equivalent) conclusion that some authors write instead of 
It follows that if  is also , meaning that  holds for all  then  if and only  
Every norm is a seminorm and both are symmetric balanced sublinear functions. A sublinear function is a seminorm if and only if it is a balanced function. On a real vector space (although not on a complex vector space), a sublinear function is a seminorm if and only if it is symmetric.

For complex or real vector spaces

The dominated extension theorem for real linear functionals implies the following alternative statement of the Hahn–Banach theorem that can be applied to linear functionals on real or complex vector spaces. 

A complex-valued functional  is said to be  if  for all  in the domain of  
With this terminology, the above statements of the Hahn–Banach theorem can be restated more succinctly:

Proof

The following observations allow the Hahn–Banach theorem for real vector spaces to be applied to (complex-valued) linear functionals on complex vector spaces.

Every linear functional  on a complex vector space is completely determined by its real part  through the formula 

and moreover, if  is a norm on  then their dual norms are equal:  

If  is a linear functional on a (complex or real) vector space  and if  is a seminorm then 

Stated in simpler language, a linear functional is dominated by a seminorm  if and only if its real part is dominated above by  

Continuity

A linear functional  on a topological vector space  is continuous if and only if this is true of its real part  if the domain is a normed space then  (where one side is infinite if and only if the other side is infinite). 
If  is a continuous sublinear function that dominates a linear functional  then  is necessarily continuous. Moreover, a linear functional  is continuous if and only if its absolute value  (which is a seminorm that dominates ) is continuous. In particular, a linear functional is continuous if and only if it is dominated by some continuous sublinear function.

Proof

This lemma remains true if  is merely a convex function instead of a sublinear function. 

Assume that  is convex, which means that  for all  and  Let   and  be as in the lemma's statement.

and hence

thus proving that  which after multiplying both sides by  becomes 
 
This implies that the values defined by 
 
are real numbers that satisfy  As in the above proof of the one–dimensional dominated extension theorem above, for any real  define  by  
It can be verified that if  then  where  follows from  when  (respectively, follows from  when ).

The lemma above is the key step in deducing the dominated extension theorem from Zorn's lemma. 

When  has countable codimension, then using induction and the lemma completes the proof of the Hahn–Banach theorem. The standard proof of the general case uses Zorn's lemma although the strictly weaker ultrafilter lemma (which is equivalent to the compactness theorem and to the Boolean prime ideal theorem) may be used instead. Hahn-Banach can also be proved using Tychonoff's theorem for compact Hausdorff spaces (which is also equivalent to the ultrafilter lemma)

The Mizar project has completely formalized and automatically checked the proof of the Hahn–Banach theorem in the HAHNBAN file.

Continuous extension theorem

The Hahn–Banach theorem can be used to guarantee the existence of continuous linear extensions of continuous linear functionals.

In category-theoretic terms, the underlying field of the vector space is an injective object in the category of locally convex vector spaces.

On a normed (or seminormed) space, a linear extension  of a bounded linear functional  is said to be  if it has the same dual norm as the original functional: 
Because of this terminology, the second part of the above theorem is sometimes referred to as the "norm-preserving" version of the Hahn–Banach theorem. Explicitly:

Proof of the continuous extension theorem

The following observations allow the continuous extension theorem to be deduced from the Hahn–Banach theorem. 

The absolute value of a linear functional is always a seminorm. A linear functional  on a topological vector space  is continuous if and only if its absolute value  is continuous, which happens if and only if there exists a continuous seminorm  on  such that  on the domain of  
If  is a locally convex space then this statement remains true when the linear functional  is defined on a  vector subspace of  
 

Proof for normed spaces

A linear functional  on a normed space is continuous if and only if it is bounded, which means that its dual norm 

is finite, in which case  holds for every point  in its domain. 
Moreover, if  is such that  for all  in the functional's domain, then necessarily 
If  is a linear extension of a linear functional  then their dual norms always satisfy  

A linear extension of a bounded linear functional  is norm-preserving if and only if the extension is dominated by the seminorm 

Non-locally convex spaces

The continuous extension theorem might fail if the topological vector space (TVS)  is not locally convex.
However, it is possible for a TVS  to not be locally convex but nevertheless have enough continuous linear functionals that its continuous dual space  separates points; for such a TVS, a continuous linear functional defined on a vector subspace  have a continuous linear extension to the whole space. 

If the TVS  is not locally convex then there might not exist any continuous seminorm   (not just on ) that dominates  in which case the Hahn–Banach theorem can not be applied as it was in the above proof of the continuous extension theorem. 

Geometric Hahn–Banach (the Hahn–Banach separation theorems)

The key element of the Hahn–Banach theorem is fundamentally a result about the separation of two convex sets:  and   This sort of argument appears widely in convex geometry, optimization theory, and economics.  Lemmas to this end derived from the original Hahn–Banach theorem are known as the Hahn–Banach separation theorems. 

When the convex sets have additional properties, such as being open or compact for example, then the conclusion can be substantially strengthened:

Then following important corollary is known as the Geometric Hahn–Banach theorem or Mazur's theorem (also known as Ascoli–Mazur theorem). It follows from the first bullet above and the convexity of  

Mazur's theorem clarifies that vector subspaces (even those that are not closed) can be characterized by linear functionals.

Supporting hyperplanes

Since points are trivially convex, geometric Hahn-Banach implies that functionals can detect the boundary of a set.  In particular, let  be a real topological vector space and  be convex with  If  then there is a functional that is vanishing at  but supported on the interior of 

Call a normed space  smooth if at each point  in its unit ball there exists a unique closed hyperplane to the unit ball at  Köthe showed in 1983 that a normed space is smooth at a point  if and only if the norm is Gateaux differentiable at that point.

Balanced or disked neighborhoods

Let  be a convex balanced neighborhood of the origin in a locally convex topological vector space  and suppose  is not an element of  Then there exists a continuous linear functional  on  such that

Applications

The Hahn–Banach theorem is the first sign of an important philosophy in functional analysis: to understand a space, one should understand its continuous functionals.

That last result also suggests that the Hahn–Banach theorem can often be used to locate a "nicer" topology in which to work.  For example, many results in functional analysis assume that a space is Hausdorff or locally convex.  However, suppose  is a topological vector space, not necessarily Hausdorff or locally convex, but with a nonempty, proper, convex, open set .  Then geometric Hahn-Banach implies that there is a hyperplane separating  from any other point.  In particular, there must exist a nonzero functional on  — that is, the continuous dual space  is non-trivial. Considering  with the weak topology induced by  then  becomes locally convex; by the second bullet of geometric Hahn-Banach, the weak topology on this new space separates points. 
Thus  with this weak topology becomes Hausdorff.  This sometimes allows some results from locally convex topological vector spaces to be applied to non-Hausdorff and non-locally convex spaces.

Partial differential equations

The Hahn–Banach theorem is often useful when one wishes to apply the method of a priori estimates. The resulting functional is often defined to be a weak solution to the equation.

Characterizing reflexive Banach spaces

Example from Fredholm theory
To illustrate an actual application of the Hahn–Banach theorem, we will now prove a result that follows almost entirely from the Hahn–Banach theorem.

Generalizations

General template

There are now many other versions of the Hahn–Banach theorem. The general template for the various versions of the Hahn–Banach theorem presented in this article is as follows:

For seminorms

So for example, suppose that  is a bounded linear functional defined on a vector subspace  of a normed space  so its the operator norm  is a non-negative real number. 

Geometric separation

Maximal dominated linear extension

If  is a singleton set (where  is some vector) and if  is such a maximal dominated linear extension of  then

Vector valued Hahn–Banach

Invariant Hahn–Banach

This theorem may be summarized:

Every -invariant continuous linear functional defined on a vector subspace of a normed space  has a -invariant Hahn–Banach extension to all of

For nonlinear functions
The following theorem of Mazur–Orlicz (1953) is equivalent to the Hahn–Banach theorem.

Converse
Let  be a topological vector space.

The Hahn–Banach theorem guarantees that every Hausdorff locally convex space has the HBEP.  For complete metrizable topological vector spaces there is a converse, due to Kalton: every complete metrizable TVS with the Hahn–Banach extension property is locally convex.  On the other hand, a vector space  of uncountable dimension, endowed with the finest vector topology, then this is a topological vector spaces with the Hahn-Banach extension property that is neither locally convex nor metrizable.

However, if  is a TVS then  vector subspace of  has the extension property if and only if  vector subspace of  has the separation property.

Relation to axiom of choice and other theorems

The proof of the Hahn–Banach theorem for real vector spaces (HB) commonly uses Zorn's lemma, which in the axiomatic framework of Zermelo–Fraenkel set theory (ZF) is equivalent to the axiom of choice (AC).  It was discovered by Łoś and Ryll-Nardzewski and independently by Luxemburg that HB can be proved using the ultrafilter lemma (UL), which is equivalent (under ZF) to the Boolean prime ideal theorem (BPI). BPI is strictly weaker than the axiom of choice and it was later shown that HB is strictly weaker than BPI.

The ultrafilter lemma is equivalent (under ZF) to the Banach–Alaoglu theorem, which is another foundational theorem in functional analysis. Although the Banach–Alaoglu theorem implies HB, it is not equivalent to it (said differently, the Banach–Alaoglu theorem is strictly stronger than HB). 
However, HB is equivalent to a certain weakened version of the Banach–Alaoglu theorem for normed spaces. 
The Hahn–Banach theorem is also equivalent to the following statement:

(∗): On every Boolean algebra  there exists a "probability charge", that is: a non-constant finitely additive map from  into 

(BPI is equivalent to the statement that there are always non-constant probability charges which take only the values 0 and 1.)

In ZF, the Hahn–Banach theorem suffices to derive the existence of a non-Lebesgue measurable set.  Moreover, the Hahn–Banach theorem implies the Banach–Tarski paradox.

For separable Banach spaces, D. K. Brown and S. G. Simpson proved that the Hahn–Banach theorem follows from WKL0, a weak subsystem of second-order arithmetic that takes a form of Kőnig's lemma restricted to binary trees as an axiom.  In fact, they prove that under a weak set of assumptions, the two are equivalent, an example of reverse mathematics.

See also

Notes

Proofs

References

Bibliography

  
  
  
  
  
   
  
  
  
  
  
  
  
  
  
  
 Reed, Michael and Simon, Barry, Methods of Modern Mathematical Physics, Vol. 1, Functional Analysis, Section III.3. Academic Press, San Diego, 1980. .
 
  
  
  
 
  
  
 Tao, Terence, The Hahn–Banach theorem, Menger's theorem, and Helly's theorem
  
  
 Wittstock, Gerd, Ein operatorwertiger Hahn-Banach Satz, J. of Functional Analysis 40 (1981), 127–150
 Zeidler, Eberhard, Applied Functional Analysis: main principles and their applications, Springer, 1995.
 

Articles containing proofs
Linear algebra
Linear functionals
Theorems in functional analysis
Topological vector spaces